Melieria cana is a species of ulidiid or picture-winged fly in the genus Melieria of the family Ulidiidae. They are found around the coast of England.

References

cana
Insects described in 1858